Punchbowl News is an online political news daily, in Washington, D.C., which debuted January 3, 2021 as "a membership-based news community," which focuses on the individuals "who power the US legislature." It intends to be non-partisan and non-judgemental, focusing on scoops and facts about Congress and the Washington power establishment, particularly core power-players.<ref name="q_and_a_2021_01_19_cjr_org">{{cite journal|first=Pete|last=Vernon|url=https://www.cjr.org/q_and_a/jake-sherman-punchbowl-politico.php|title=Q&A: Punchbowl'''s Jake Sherman on Capitol coverage in the new Washington|journal=Columbia Journalism Review|publisher=Columbia University|location=New York City|date=January 19, 2021|accessdate=April 19, 2021}}</ref>

The initial products from Punchbowl included a free weekday-morning newsletter. Premium subscribers (annual subscription: $300) also received afternoon and evening editions, and access to question-and-answer sessions with the authors, online via Zoom, and a Sunday conversation. The team launched a podcast with Cadence13 in early February 2021, and by early April 2021, it was available as The Daily Punch on Apple Podcasts Preview. Conference calls and virtual events are also to be provided to subscribers.

Concept and orientation
The publication gets its name from the codename used by the U.S. Secret Service for the U.S. Capitol.

In a January 2021 interview with the Columbia Journalism Review, co-founder Jake Sherman indicated that Punchbowl's objectives were to:
.) ...make news "a conversation between... audience and... reporters."
.) "...chart power and... focus on the one hundred [persons in power who] matter... congressional leadership... people around [them], corporations that war in Washington, [along with] leadership at the White House."

Sherman indicated that the publication would be non-partisan, and refrain from value judgments and commentary, focusing instead on identifying newsworthy facts.

Washington insiders, as subscribers, were the Punchbowls initial target market. Sherman described his target market as "people who [must] exist in Washington, people who [must] exist in the government, or [people] who deeply care about it" — whether professionally or as a hobby.

Sherman said that Punchbowl News would differentiate itself from other media by largely ignoring sensational stories about the declarations, posturing, and gaffes of individual politicians and officials — focusing, instead, on "power... exercise of power... people abusing power."

History and organization
FoundingPunchbowl News was founded by 3 journalist-authors departing Politico: Jake Sherman and Anna Palmer (co-authors of Politico Playbook and the best-seller The Hill to Die On: The Battle for Congress and the Future of Trump’s America), and co-founder John Bresnahan, a then-recent Capitol Hill reporter for Politico, along with Rachel Schindler, formerly with Facebook's news team.

Initial funding, organized by the media banker Aryeh Bourkoff, of Kindred Media, was US$1million, which was small startup funding compared to the semi-rivals Politico and Axios. However, Sherman reported that they initially garnered far more subscribers than expected.

Staff and leadership
Initial staffing involved only the four co-founders, with Palmer as CEO and Schindler running operations — but Sherman indicated in January that they planned to expand and diversify the team.

Events
Within 72 hours of the first publication of Punchbowl News on January 6, 2021, the Capitol was stormed and occupied by protestors in a violent insurrection. Sherman and Bresnahan were present behind a door on which protesters were banging.

Controversy
In February 2021, Punchbowl News was sued by Punchbowl, Inc., a Massachusetts greeting card company, for trademark infringement—claiming that the Punchbowl News company name, logo and trademark color unfairly resembled theirs. The suit was dismissed in Virginia for improper venue. Punchbowl, Inc., re-filed in California. Punchbowl News won on summary judgement and the case was dismissed. Punchbowl Inc. filed an appeal to the Ninth Circuit, and Punchbowl News won again.

In January 2023, Voice of America reported that Punchbowl News'' received sponsorship funding from Alibaba Group.

References

External links
 

News agencies based in the United States